Jared Warner Williams (December 22, 1796September 29, 1864) was an American lawyer and politician from Lancaster, New Hampshire, who was a U.S. representative, the 21st governor of New Hampshire 1847 to 1849 and a United States senator.

Biography
Williams was born in West Woodstock, Connecticut, on December 22, 1796. He graduated from Brown University in 1818, studied at the Litchfield Law School, and became an attorney in Lancaster, New Hampshire.

A Democrat, he sat in the New Hampshire House of Representatives from 1830 to 1831, the New Hampshire State Senate from 1832 to 1834 and the New Hampshire House again from 1835 to 1836.

In 1836, he won election to the U.S. House of Representatives and he sat two terms, March 4, 1837, to March 3, 1841. In 1847, he was elected governor and served two one-year terms, June 3, 1847, to June 7, 1849.

After leaving the governorship, Williams was appointed Coos County Judge of Probate, a position he held until 1852. In 1853, he was appointed to the U.S. Senate, temporarily filling the vacancy caused by Charles G. Atherton's death, and he served from November 29, 1853, to August 4, 1854.

Williams died in Lancaster on September 29, 1864, and is buried in the Summer Street Cemetery there.

References

External links

Jared Warner Williams at National Governors Association
Jared Warner Williams at Proceedings of the Grafton and Coös County Bar Association, Volume 3 (1898)

1796 births
1864 deaths
People from Woodstock, Connecticut
Democratic Party governors of New Hampshire
Democratic Party New Hampshire state senators
Democratic Party members of the New Hampshire House of Representatives
New Hampshire state court judges
New Hampshire lawyers
Brown University alumni
Litchfield Law School alumni
Democratic Party United States senators from New Hampshire
Burials in New Hampshire
Democratic Party members of the United States House of Representatives from New Hampshire
19th-century American politicians
19th-century American judges
19th-century American lawyers